Lombardore is a comune (municipality) in the Metropolitan City of Turin in the Italian region Piedmont, located about  north of Turin.

Twin towns — sister cities
Lombardore is twinned with:

  Casca, Brazil

References

Cities and towns in Piedmont